Fulton Hill is a mountain in Schoharie County, New York. It is located northwest of West Fulton. The Cobble is located west-northwest and Rossman Hill is located southeast of Fulton Hill.

References

Mountains of Schoharie County, New York
Mountains of New York (state)